The 2021 Alsco Uniforms 300 was a NASCAR Xfinity Series race held on March 6, 2021. It was contested over 200 laps on the  oval. It was the fourth race of the 2021 NASCAR Xfinity Series season. Kaulig Racing driver A. J. Allmendinger collected his first win of the season.

Report

Background
Las Vegas Motor Speedway, located in Clark County, Nevada outside the Las Vegas city limits and about 15 miles northeast of the Las Vegas Strip, is a  complex of multiple tracks for motorsports racing. The complex is owned by Speedway Motorsports, Inc., which is headquartered in Charlotte, North Carolina.

Entry list 

 (R) denotes rookie driver.
 (i) denotes driver who is ineligible for series driver points.

Qualifying
Myatt Snider was awarded the pole for the race as determined by competition-based formula. Jordan Anderson, Dillon Bassett, and Andy Lally did not have enough points to qualify for the race.

Starting Lineups

Race

Race results

Stage Results 
Stage One
Laps: 45

Stage Two
Laps: 30

Final Stage Results 

Laps: 110

Race statistics 

 Lead changes: 23 among 7 different drivers
 Cautions/Laps: 8 for 45
 Time of race: 2 hours, 38 minutes, and 10 seconds
 Average speed:

References 

NASCAR races at Las Vegas Motor Speedway
2021 in sports in Nevada
Alsco Uniforms 300
2021 NASCAR Xfinity Series